"Stay Away" may refer to:

 "Stay Away" (Elvis Presley song), a song by Elvis Presley from the 1968 film Stay Away, Joe
 "Stay Away" (L'Arc-en-Ciel song), a 2000 song by L'Arc-en-Ciel
 "Stay Away", a song by Barbra Streisand from the 1978 album Songbird
 "Stay Away", a song by Kim Carnes from the 1979 album St. Vincent's Court
 "Stay Away", a song by The Angels from the 1983 album Watch the Red
 "Stay Away", a song by Toto from the 1988 album The Seventh One
 "Stay Away", a song by Nirvana from the 1991 album Nevermind
 "Stay Away", a song by Rooney from the 2003 album Rooney
 "Stay Away", a song by Pain from the 2005 album Dancing with the Dead
 "Stay Away", a song by Dave Barnes from the 2006 album Chasing Mississippi
 "Stay Away", a song by Chris Thile from the 2006 album How to Grow a Woman from the Ground
 "Stay Away", a song by The Honorary Title from the 2007 album Scream & Light Up the Sky
 "Stay Away", a song by Secondhand Serenade from the 2010 album Hear Me Now
 "Stay Away", a song by Elliott Yamin from the 2011 album Gather 'Round
 "Stay Away", a song by Charli XCX from the 2013 album True Romance
 "Stay Away", a song by Erik Hassle from the 2013 EP Mariefred Sessions
 "Stay Away", a song by Lee DeWyze from the 2013 album Frames
 "Stay Away", a song by Falling in Reverse from the 2015 album Just Like You
 "Stay Away", a song by E-40 from the 2016 album The D-Boy Diary: Book 1
 "Stay Away", a song by Styles P from the 2018 EP Nickel Bag
 "Stay Away", a song by Koryn Hawthorne from the 2018 album Unstoppable
 "Stay Away", a song by L.A. Guns from the 2019 album The Devil You Know
 "Stay Away (It's Like That)", a song by TV Girl from the 2020 album The Night in Question: French Exit Outtakes
 "Stay Away", a song by Carly Rae Jepsen from the 2020 album Dedicated Side B
 "Stay Away", a 2014 single by G Hannelius
 "Stay Away", a 2020 single by Randy Newman
 "Stay Away", a 2020 single by Mod Sun